The virtuality continuum is a continuous scale ranging between the completely virtual, a virtuality, and the completely real, reality. The reality–virtuality continuum therefore encompasses all possible variations and compositions of real and virtual objects. It has been described as a concept in new media and computer science, but in fact it could be considered a matter of anthropology.  The concept was first introduced by Paul Milgram.

The area between the two extremes, where both the real and the virtual are mixed, is called mixed reality. This in turn is said to consist of both augmented reality, where the virtual augments the real, and augmented virtuality, where the real augments the virtual.

Overview

This continuum has been extended into a two-dimensional plane of virtuality and mediality.  Taxonomy of reality, virtuality, mediality. The origin R denotes unmodified reality. A continuum across the virtuality axis, V, includes reality augmented with graphics (augmented reality), as well as graphics augmented by reality (augmented virtuality). However, the taxonomy also includes modification of reality or virtuality or any combination of these.  

The mediality axis denotes changes. The modification is denoted by moving up the mediality axis. Further up this axis, for example, we can find mediated reality, mediated virtuality, or any combination of these. Further up and to the right, we have virtual worlds that are responsive to a severely modified version of reality. 

The virtuality continuum has grown and progressed past labels such as computer science and new media. As the concept has much to do with the way in which humans continue to change how they communicate; the way in which identities form and the way in which they interact to and within the world; it is more accurately described as a subject within anthropology.

Changes in attitudes towards and the increase in availability of technology and media have changed and progressed the way it is used. One to one (SMS), one to many (email), and many to many (chat rooms), have become ingrained in society. The use of such items have made once clear distinctions like online and offline obsolete, and the distinctions between reality and virtuality have become blurred as people are incorporating and relying heavily upon virtuality within their everyday personal realities.

Daniel Miller and Don Slater are prominent researchers pursuing the concept of the virtuality continuum and the media and its effect on communities, especially in the Caribbean, most notably Trinidad and Jamaica.

Steve Woolgar is another researcher who has established four rules of virtuality. These are:
The way in which media and technology affect people relies on their non-information communication technology (ICT) related background which may include gender, age, social status, income amongst others.
Risks and fears in regards to new media and technology are unevenly socially distributed.
Advancements in media and technology supplement rather than replace existing activities in reality.
New media and technology tends to create new kinds of localism rather than furthering globalization.

See also
 Computer-mediated reality
 Extended reality
 Simulated reality
 Transreality gaming

References

External links
Mixed Reality Scale – Milgram and Kishino's (1994) Virtuality Continuum paraphrase with examples.

Reality
Multimodal interaction
Virtual reality
Mixed reality
1994 introductions